Beauty is an aesthetic characteristic.

Beauty may also refer to:

Science and mathematics 
 Beauty (quantum number) or bottomness, a flavour quantum number
 Mathematical beauty, a mathematical philosophy

Characters 
 Beauty (Belle), a central character in the fairy tale Beauty and the Beast and adaptations
 Beauty, the main character in The Sleeping Beauty Quartet, a series of novels by Anne Rice (writing as A. N. Roquelaure)
 Beauty, anime/manga series character from Bobobo-bo Bo-bobo, see list of characters

Film and television 
 Two 1965 films by Andy Warhol:
 Beauty No. 1
 Beauty No. 2
 Beauty: In the Eyes of the Beheld, a 2008 American documentary by Liza Figueroa Kravinsky
 Beauty (2009 film), a Japanese film by Toshio Gotō
 Beauty (2011 film), a South African film by Oliver Hermanus
 Beauty (2022 film), an American film by Andrew Dosunmu
 "Beauty" (Once Upon a Time), a 2017 television episode

Literature 
 Beauty (Selbourne novel), a 2009 novel by Raphael Selbourne
 Beauty (Tepper novel), a 1991 novel by Sheri S. Tepper
 Beauty: A Retelling of the Story of Beauty and the Beast, a 1978 young-adult novel by Robin McKinley
 Beauty, a 1992 novel by Brian D'Amato
 Beauty, a 2012 Anita Blake: Vampire Hunter book by Laurell K. Hamilton
 "Beauty", a 2003 short story by Sherwood Smith

Music 
 The Beauties, a Canadian roots/country band

Albums
 Beauty (Ryuichi Sakamoto album), 1989
 Beauty (Neutral Milk Hotel album), 1992
 Beauty?, by Sound of the Blue Heart (2006)

Songs
 "Beauty" (song), by Mötley Crüe
 "Beauty", by Alan, a B-side of the single "Swear"
 "Beauty", by Edan from Beauty and the Beat
 "Beauty", by Shaye (2004)
 "Beauty", by Earth, Wind and Fire from The Need of Love (1971)

People 
 Beauty Dlulane, South African Member of Parliament
Beauty Gonzalez (born 1991), Filipino-Spanish actress
 Beauty McGowan (1901–1982), American baseball player
 Beauty Ngxongo (born 1953), South African master Zulu basket weaver
 Beauty Turner (1957–2008), American housing activist and journalist

Places in the United States
 Beauty, Kentucky, an unincorporated community
 Beauty, West Virginia, an unincorporated community
 Beauty Lake, a lake in Montana

Other uses 
 Beauty (ancient thought)
 Beauty (dog), a World War II search and rescue dog
 The Beauty, a 1915 Boris Kustodiev painting
 Beauty industry, or sometimes just "Beauty," is a catch-all term for the services and products that deal with feminine appearance (Cosmetics, Hairstyling, etc.)

See also
 Aesthetics, a branch of philosophy dealing with the nature of beauty, art, and taste
 Beauty and the Beast (disambiguation)
 Black Beauty (disambiguation)
 Sleeping Beauty (disambiguation)
 Beautiful (disambiguation)
 Pretty (disambiguation)
 Unattractiveness, the antonym of beauty